The Baron Empain Palace ("Qasr el Baron Emban"), better known as Le Palais Hindou (literally, The Hindu Palace), is a distinctive and historic Hindu temple inspired mansion in Heliopolis, a suburb northeast of central Cairo, Egypt. It was founded by Edward Louis Joseph Empain, a Belgian businessman who was awarded the title of "Baron" by the King of Belgium.

Architecture
The palace was designed by an architect named Alexandre Marcel who was born in Belgium. The palace was decorated by Georges-Louis Claude. Inspired mostly by the Hindu temples of South India, it was built between 1907 and 1911, in reinforced concrete.

See also

Heliopolis Style architecture

References

External links
 Une définition élargie du patrimoine
 La "Villa Hindoue"
 

Barons Empain
Palaces in Cairo
History of Cairo
Buildings and structures in Cairo